Slave of Love  ( Siro Gerin) was an Armenian romantic drama television series. The series premiered on Shant TV on September 1, 2014.
The series takes place in Yerevan, Armenia.

Series overview

Cast and characters

Sofya Poghosyan portrays Anoush Babayan
Ashot Ter-Matevosyan portrays Rouben Santrosyan
Marinka Khachatryan portrays Arbi Mirzoyan
Tigran Mnacakanyan portrays Babken Mirzoyan
Gayane Balyan portrays Hasmik Mirzoyan
Syuzan Ghevondyan portrays Emma Santrosyan 
Sevak Santrosyan portrays Sokrat
Syuzan Papyan portrays Lili Santrosyan
Mariam Aristakesyan portrays Janna
Armine Hakobyan portrays Sona
Shogher Smbatyan portrays Anoushik
Karen Galstyan portrays Razmik
Hayk Hovhannisyan portrays Mkrtich
Emma Manukyan portrays Srbuhi
Ben Avetisyan portrays Erik
Mariana Gevorgyan portrays Svetlana
Hayk Hovhannisyan portrays Mika Mesropyan

References

External links
 
 
 Slave of Love on Hayojax

Armenian drama television series
Armenian-language television shows
2014 Armenian television series debuts
2010s Armenian television series
Shant TV original programming